Antonella Gambotto-Burke (née Antonella Gambotto, born 19 September 1965) is an Italian-Australian author, journalist and singer-songwriter based in Kent, England, known for her writing about sex, death and motherhood.

Gambotto-Burke is best known for her memoir The Eclipse: A Memoir of Suicide and memoir/maternal feminist polemic Mama: Love, Motherhood and Revolution.

Biography

Early years
Gambotto-Burke was born in North Sydney and moved to East Lindfield on Sydney's North Shore at the age of four, the first child and only daughter of the late Giancarlo Gambotto, whose High Court win against WCP Ltd. changed Australian corporate law, made the front pages of the Australian Financial Review and The Australian, is still featured in corporate law exams, and was the subject of a book edited by Ian Ramsay, Professor of Law at Melbourne University. "I was raised to believe that I could achieve anything", she said in a North Shore Times cover story.

Gambotto-Burke was first published in The Sydney Morning Herald at the age of sixteen – a satire of poet Les Murray's "An Absolutely Ordinary Rainbow", later included in Michele Field's anthology Shrinklit (1983). She was first published in The Australian at the age of eighteen. Her first short story was published in literary magazine Billy Blue Magazine in July 1982.

The Sydney Morning Herald named her as a member of Mensa International.

Initial journalistic success and controversy
In 1984, at the age of 19, she moved to London, where she was employed as a music critic by NME and where, on the advice of an editor, she wrote under the pseudonyms Antonella Black and Ginger Meggs. Her review of Cliff Richard's concert inspired him to sue the music journal. She also wrote "A Man Called Horse", an unflattering cover story of alternative rock star Nick Cave, in which she documented his heroin-induced stupor (in retaliation, he wrote a song about her and British journalist Mat Snow entitled "Scum"; a photograph of Gambotto-Burke and Snow was published with Snow's account of the story in The Guardian). Gambotto-Burke wrote about the experience most recently in September 2006, and the interview has been reprinted for the third time in Nick Cave: Sinner, Saint. The Cave interview, and the story behind it, are also included in her book Lunch of Blood, while Nick Cave and the Bad Seeds included a version of "Scum" on their 2005 box set, B-Sides And Rarities.

Gambotto-Burke's best known comic interview – with Warwick Capper, a retired Australian rules footballer, and his wife – is included in The Best Australian Profiles (Black Inc., 2004). "The best profiles lodge deep in the public mind, such as ... Antonella Gambotto's cheerfully dopey Warwick and Joanne Capper, which presaged by years the arrival of Kath & Kim", Matthew Ricketson wrote in 2005.

Her interviewees included Martin Amis, Elle Macpherson, Gérard Depardieu, Ben Elton, Morrissey, Thierry Mugler, Marc Newson, Deepak Chopra, Flavio Briatore, Robert Smith, Erica Jong, Colleen McCullough, Jeffrey Archer, Princess Haya bint Al Hussein, Jerry Hall and Naomi Wolf.

Gambotto-Burke won UK Cosmopolitan magazine's New Journalist of the Year Award in 1988. That same year, she became engaged to the UK GQ editor Michael VerMeulen. In 1989 she returned to Sydney, after the demise of her relationship with VerMeulen, who died from a cocaine overdose at the age of 38 in 1995. Before leaving London, Gambotto-Burke wrote for The Independent on Sunday, notably a cover story on cardiothoracic surgeons.

In 1989, she returned to Sydney, where she resumed contributing to The Weekend Australian as a feature profile writer and literary critic, and also began writing for The South China Morning Post, The Globe and Mail in Canada, Harper's Bazaar, Elle, Vogue and other international publications. Channel Nine Entertainment Director Richard Wilkins noted that "if you're on her wavelength, the interview is a most enjoyable experience. If not, it could be quite disconcerting. The key is to be open and honest with her."

After divorcing, she returned to England with her daughter in 2017 and began working for The Sunday Times and other newspapers. In October 2020, she was revealed as the inspiration for British novelist Martin Amis's most iconic female characters, notably Nicola Six from London Fields (novel) and Zoya from House of Meetings. Amis did not deny their five-year relationship, nor did he publicly explain the many parallels she pointed out in her story to his characters and that of the character "Giovana" in his wife Isabel Fonseca's novel, Attachment, to her own life.

Anthologies

Lunch of Blood (Random House, 1994), her first book and first anthology, peaked at number six on the best-seller lists. The Newcastle Herald observed that Gambotto-Burke's "command of language is delicious to the point where one wonders which came first, her wish to display her ability or the desire to share her impressions." In 1997, An Instinct for the Kill, her second anthology, was published to mixed reviews by HarperCollins. (Age critic Katherine Wilson singled out the Capper interview as "laugh-out-loud" funny.)

The introduction to Gambotto-Burke's work in The Best Australian Profiles reads: "Gambotto is probably the closest Australia has come to having a profile writer who is a celebrity in their own right ... and from the early 1990s readers became as interested in Gambotto-Burke as they were in the people she profiled."

In Undercover Agent, Murray Waldren noted that "an interview with [Gambotto-Burke] often has the studied savagery of the corrida amid the crystal cruet ambience of high tea at the Ritz. Such ritualistic disembowelling, highly entertaining and in stark contrast to the asinine, PR-driven pap of most modern profiles, leave the gored stirred and very shaken."

Fiction

She was a contributor to the late Peter Blazey's anthology of short stories Love Cries: Cruel Passions, Strange Desires (1995); in The Sydney Morning Herald, Gail Cork described Gambotto's contribution as "outstanding" and in Who, Margaret Smith noted its "darkly sinister" overtones. "The Astronomer", a short story presaging many of the themes in her first novel, was published in 1989. Eight years later, Gambotto-Burke's first novel, The Pure Weight of the Heart (also featuring an astronomer), was published by Orion Publishing in London, and went to number six on the Sydney Morning Herald'''s best-seller list. It was also Tatler's book of the month. Author Matthew Condon elaborated in The Age: "Her razor eye for the architecture of pretension and her ability to record untidied dialogue, especially the way it can betray the human mind and soul, have made her an object of fear and derision. To have been 'Gambottoed' is to have had a vein opened."

Bereavement

After her brother Gianluca, a Macquarie Bank executive, committed suicide in 2001, Gambotto-Burke changed. She began reading obsessively on death and on suicide, "trying to make sense of the experience, trying to become big enough to let go of my brother. That’s what bereavement is about – surrendering the memory, the relationship." To this end, she relocated to Byron Bay, where she wrote The Eclipse: A Memoir of Suicide, a book about her brother's suicide and her engagement to, and the death of, late British GQ editor Michael VerMeulen. In a November 2003 interview with a British magazine, she said: "I wanted to explain depression as a valid emotional response rather than as a disease ... I am not ashamed of my brother, and I do not see death as tragic – deliberate ignorance and fear are tragedies, not death."

Film
Gambotto-Burke was commissioned to write the core love stories of artist David Bromley's series of films, I Could Be Me (narrated by Hugo Weaving), which premiered at the Adelaide Festival in 2008. In an essay, she noted that, "As scripts are founded on what Alan Alda calls the 'subsurface tectonics of emotion', the result can sometimes be a psychic slam dunk." Director Bromley described the film as "like a kaleidoscope of images and it is run by my poetry and short stories by Antonella. And it has a large animation component."

Motherhood
Gambotto-Burke dedicated her first book about parenthood, Mama: Love, Motherhood and Revolution (2015) to her daughter Bethesda, who was born in December 2005. The foreword was written by the French obstetrician and academic Michel Odent."Women risk losing ability to give birth naturally" by Rozina Sabur, The Daily Telegraph, 24 May 2015 Gambotto-Burke is a vocal advocate of increased intimacy with children and practised co-sleeping. Controversially, she also home-schools her daughter. In a Life Matters interview with Natasha Mitchell, Dr. John Irvine described Mama as being to motherhood what The Female Eunuch was to feminism. "The association of maternal-infant separation with developmental havoc is not new, and yet despite the evidence, little change has been made to the way mothers and babies are treated, both by hospitals and by society at large", Gambotto-Burke writes. An excerpt of Mama: Love, Motherhood and Revolution was printed in The Guardian newspaper.

In 2020, she announced that she was working on the sequel, Apple: Sex, Drugs, Motherhood and the Recovery of the Feminine.

Recent work
Gambotto-Burke has in recent years changed her journalistic focus. Her writing about human trafficking has been syndicated around the world. She is also a widely published literary critic and essayist, and has written a number of lead news stories for The Australians business pages about lawyers and legal issues."Business demands fixed fees as revolt builds against billable hours" by Antonella Gambotto-Burke, The Australian, 20 August 2010"Corporates taken to the cleaners with billing abuses" by Antonella Gambotto-Burke, The Australian, 27 August 2010

Most recently, Gambotto-Burke's focus has been on pornography and gender inequality."Gender wars heat up with Butterfly Politics by Catharine A. MacKinnon" by Antonella Gambotto-Burke, The Weekend Australian, 22 July 2017

Creation Records Founder and Oasis manager Alan McGee, in a 2019 interview with Gambotto-Burke, described her as "forever surprising". In 2019, she released her first song, Dead from the Heart Up. The idea to write a song, she said, came from a suggestion made from a friend of McGee's.

From June 2019 to February 2020, Gambotto-Burke hosted The Antonella Show, her own programme on London's Boogaloo Radio, which featured guests such as producer and composer Magnus Fiennes, sculptor Beth Carter, musician Jah Wobble and songs from upcoming independent artists. She stopped, she said on air, to commence work on her new book.

In April 2021, she announced that she would be writing a weekly column for the literary pages of The Weekend Australian.

Upon completing her book "Apple: Sex, Drugs, Motherhood and the Recovery of the Feminine" Gambotto-Burke formed her own band AF. Its debut single "I Didn't See it Coming" which she wrote and sings, is scheduled for release at the end of 2022.<ref>fashionindustrybroadcast.com FIB exclusive chat: Antonella Gambotto-Burke on Upcoming AF Debit Single - "I Didn't See It Coming" 3 April 2022 Holly-Beth Quinn. Retrieved 12 June 2022</ref>

Bibliography

Anthologies
An Instinct for the Kill (HarperCollins Australia, 1997)
Lunch of Blood (Random House Australia, 1994)
MOUTH (Broken Ankle Digital, 2013)

Novel
The Pure Weight of the Heart (Orion UK, 1998)

Memoirs
The Eclipse: A Memoir of Suicide (Broken Ankle Books, 2003)

Motherhood
 Mama: Dispatches from the Frontline of Love (Arbon, 2014)
 Mama: Love, Motherhood and Revolution (Pinter & Martin 2015)
 Apple: Sex, Drugs, Motherhood and the Recovery of the Feminine (Pinter & Martin 2022)

As a contributor
 Write A Letter to Your Twenty Year Old Self, edited by Kim Chandler McDonald (2020).
 Nick Cave: Sinner, Saint: The True Confessions, 30 Years of Essential Interviews, edited by Mat Snow (Plexus Publishing, 2011).
 My Favourite Teacher, edited by Robert Macklin (University of New South Wales Press, 2011).
 Your Mother Would Be Proud: True Tales of Mayhem and Misadventure, edited by Tamara Sheward and Jenny Valentish (Allen & Unwin, 2009).
 What Is Mother Love?, edited by Selwa Anthony (Penguin, 2008).
 Some Girls Do ... My Life as a Teenager, edited by Jacinta Tynan (Allen & Unwin, 2007).
 The Best Australian Profiles, edited by Matthew Ricketson (Black Inc., 2004).
 The Thoughts of Chairman Stan, by Stan Zemanek (HarperCollins Australia, 1998): afterword by Gambotto-Burke.
 Love Cries: Cruel Passions, Strange Desires, edited by Peter Blazey (HarperCollins Australia, 1995).
 This I Believe: 100 Eminent Australians Explore Life's Big Question, edited by John Marsden (writer) (Random House Australia, 1996).
 ShrinkLit, edited by Michele Field (Penguin, 1983).

Visual media

Scriptwriting
I Could Be Me, directed by David Bromley (2008)

Television appearances
Gambotto-Burke has appeared on programs such as Beauty & The Beast (Channel Ten, Foxtel), The Midday Show (Channel 9), Meet the Press (SBS), Wake Up (Channel Ten), Mornings (Channel 9) and performed cameos on Paul Fenech's SBS sitcom Pizza.

References

External links

 
 , Gambotto-Burke on Beauty and the Beast

1965 births
Australian journalists
The Australian journalists
Australian women journalists
Australian columnists
Australian women columnists
Living people
Australian memoirists
Mensans
20th-century Australian novelists
21st-century Australian writers
20th-century Australian women writers
Australian women memoirists
Australian women novelists
21st-century Australian women writers